Founded in 1979, the Aspen Art Museum (AAM) is a non-collecting contemporary art museum located in Aspen, Colorado. AAM exhibitions include drawings, paintings, sculptures, multimedia installations and electronic media.

Building
Previously housed in a converted hydroelectric plant at 590 North Mill Street, the Aspen Art Museum (AAM) opened its new facility to the public at 637 East Hyman Avenue on August 9, 2014, . The building is designed by architect Shigeru Ban,  recipient of the 2014 Pritzker Prize for Architecture. It is Ban's first US museum to be constructed. The 33,000-square-foot, four-level facility houses eight exhibition spaces: six gallery spaces, a roof top sculpture garden, and an outdoor commons. There are five main architectural features within the building's design plan: Grand Stair, Moving Glass Room Elevator, Woven Wood Screen, Wood Roof Truss and Walkable Skylights.

Accreditation
The Aspen Art Museum is accredited by the American Alliance of Museums. The museum is a member institution of the Association of Art Museum Directors (AAMD), which represents directors of art museums throughout the United States, Canada, and Mexico. 
In March 2009, the AAM joined other Aspen area businesses through becoming certified under a jointly run City of Aspen Environmental Health Department and Canary Initiative “ZGreen” program. Environmental efforts undertaken by the AAM through the ZGreen program include recycling, composting, and zero waste events.

Residency programs

The AAM's Distinguished Artist in Residence Program was first established in 2006. The Aspen Art Museum’s annual artist in residency program brings artists to Aspen, Colorado, to work on creating a new body of work, which will ultimately be exhibited in the AAM galleries. Artists in residence hold a gallery walkthrough and a lecture as part of their residency.

References

External links
Aspen Art Museum
“Art Matters!” Television at GrassRootsTV12

Buildings and structures in Aspen, Colorado
Art museums and galleries in Colorado
Art museums established in 1979
Museums in Pitkin County, Colorado
Institutions accredited by the American Alliance of Museums
1979 establishments in Colorado
Contemporary art galleries in the United States
Tourist attractions in Aspen, Colorado
Shigeru Ban buildings